Lee Na-ra (born August 22, 1980) is a South Korean actress. She has worked on films such as Moebius and Kabukicho Love Hotel. In 2013, she was nominated for Best New Actress at the 34th Blue Dragon Film Awards.

Filmography
Feature films
 Romantic Heaven (2011)
 Moebius (2013)
 An Ethics Lesson (2013)
 Gyeongju (2014)
 One on One (2014)
 Kabukicho Love Hotel (2014)
 Alive (2015)
 The Tiger: An Old Hunter's Tale (2015)
 Black Money (2019)

Television series
 Signal (2016)
 While You Were Sleeping (2017)
 Priest (2018)
 The Good Detective (2022)
 Somebody (2022)

References

External links
 
 
 

1980 births
Living people
South Korean film actresses
South Korean television actresses
21st-century South Korean actresses